John O'Shea (born 1981) is an Irish former footballer.

John O'Shea may also refer to:

John O'Shea (director) (1920–2001), New Zealand film director
John O'Shea (humanitarian) (born 1944), founder and CEO of GOAL, an Irish non-governmental organization
John O'Shea (rugby union) (born 1940), Wales international rugby union footballer
John J. O'Shea, American physician and immunologist
John O'Shea (darts player) (born 1975), Irish darts player
John Joe O'Shea, Irish darts player
John Augustus O'Shea (1839–1905), Irish soldier, journalist and novelist
A member of the stone carving family O'Shea and Whelan
John O'Shea, commander of the 87th Division (United States)
John O'Shea (artist) (1876-1956), California impressionist painter

See also
John Shea (disambiguation)